27 may refer to:

27 (number), the natural number following 26 and preceding 28
 one of the years 27 BC, AD 27, 1927, 2027

Music 
27 (band), an American rock band from Boston, Massachusetts
27 Club, musicians who died at the age of 27
27 (opera), a 2014 opera by Ricky Ian Gordon and Royce Vavrek
27 (album), a 2012 album by Ciro y los Persas
 27 (Cunter album), 2013
27 (Kim Sung-kyu EP), 2015
"27" (song), a 2002 song by the Scottish band Biffy Clyro
"27", a 2008 song by Fall Out Boy from the album Folie à Deux
”27”, a 2017 song by Machine Gun Kelly from the album bloom

Other uses 
27, a 2011 play by Abi Morgan
27 (artist) or Deuce 7, American street artist
The apostrophe, shown in the URL as %27

See also 
 Type 27 (disambiguation)
 List of highways numbered 27